Henry Martyn Hoyt Jr. (December 5, 1856 – November 20, 1910) served as Solicitor General of the United States from 1903 to 1909. His father, also named Henry Martyn Hoyt, served as governor of Pennsylvania from 1879 to 1883.

Early life
Hoyt was born on December 5, 1856 in Wilkes-Barre, the son of Henry Martyn Hoyt, the governor of Pennsylvania from 1879 to 1883. He graduated from Yale University in 1878 and the law school of the University of Pennsylvania in 1881.

Career
After a career spent in private practice as a lawyer in Pennsylvania, starting in Pittsburgh and then in banking he became an Assistant Attorney General in 1897. In 1903, he was appointed Solicitor General by Theodore Roosevelt. After the end of Roosevelt's term in office he became a counselor to Secretary of State Philander C. Knox.

Personal life
In 1883, Hoyt married Anne McMichael, a daughter of Col. Morton McMichael Jr., "one of the foremost citizens of Philadelphia" and a granddaughter of Mayor Morton McMichael. Together, they had five children, including:

 Elinor Wylie (1885–1928), a poet who married three times.
 Henry Martyn Hoyt III (1887–1920), an artist who married Alice Gordon Parker (1885–1951).
 Constance A. Hoyt (1889–1923), who married Baron Ferdinand von Stumm-Halberg, in 1910.
 Morton McMichael Hoyt (1899–1949), who three times married, and divorced, Eugenia Bankhead, known as "Sister" and sister of Tallulah Bankhead.
 Nancy McMichael Hoyt (b. 1902), a romance novelist who wrote Elinor Wylie: The Portrait of an Unknown Woman in 1935; she married Edward Davison Curtis; they divorced in 1932.

Hoyt died on November 20, 1910 in Washington, D.C.

References

External links

1856 births
1910 deaths
People from Wilkes-Barre, Pennsylvania
United States Solicitors General
Pennsylvania lawyers
Yale University alumni
University of Pennsylvania Law School alumni
Place of death missing
19th-century American lawyers